Anthony William Derek Larkum is a british plant scientist and academic based in Sydney. He is Professor Emeritus of Plant Sciences at the University of Sydney and Adjunct Professor at the University of Technology Sydney (UTS).

Much of Larkum's research has been on marine algae, seagrasses and coral reef. He has done considerable research on photoinhibition, UV inhibition, photosynthesis and light harvesting. Since 1997, a great part of his research has been devoted to understanding the process of mass coral bleaching, more specifically the bleaching of the Great Barrier Reef. Some of his research has also studied novel cyanobacteria, such as Acaryochloris. He has discovered a number of new taxa in the seagrass genus Halophila. One of these is the species of Halophila from One Tree Island on the Great Barrier Reef. He has written eight books and over 250 articles.

Biography and work 
After completing a BSc (Special) degree from Imperial College in 1961, he conducted biochemical research with Henrik Lundegårdh at the University of Upsala, Sweden for 1 year. Then he continued his postgraduate research at Oxford University where he received his D.Phil in 1966 for a thesis concerned with the processes of ion uptake in plant roots.

During his post-doctoral fellowship at the University of Cambridge, he was in the laboratory of Enid MacRobbie and studied the ionic status of chloroplasts. He investigated the role of compatible solutes in energy transduction in chloroplasts and wrote the paper Ionic Relations of Chloroplasts in Vivo published in Nature, showing that chloroplasts have much higher salt concentrations than the surrounding cytoplasm and that this difference is involved in energy transduction. At this time, he was also involved in developing early applications of underwater (SCUBA) techniques to plant physiology, particularly the ways in which algae harvest energy in situ. In 1968, he joined the University of Pennsylvania for a postdoctoral fellowship on energy transduction in chloroplasts.

In 1969, he moved to Sydney and joined University of Sydney as a lecturer in Plant Physiology, becoming Associate Professor of Biology in 1982 and Professor in 1994. Under the aegis of Australian Academy of Science, he organized the first Fenner Environment Conference on Ultraviolent B Radiation Impacts in Canberra. The conference also set up a working party for which he was the chair to set guidelines for a proposal to International Geophysical Biological Program for work on UV-B impacts. At the same time he was appointed to the Biology Committee of the Australian Research Council; later becoming the chairman.

From 1996 until 2000, he was the Deputy of School of School of Biological Sciences and also served as the Director of Sydney University Biological Informatics and Technology Centre (SUBIT) from 2000 to 2004. In 2001, he became professorial fellow and later, in 2003, Professor Emeritus at the University. In 2009, he joined University of Technology as an adjunct professor, where he now works in the C3 Global Change Cluster.

Larkum is a member of Australian Marine Sciences Association, Australian Society of Phycology and Aquatic Botany, International Photosynthesis Society and International Coral Reef Society. He has served on the editorial boards of Aquatic Botany, Marine Biology and Oceanography, Phycologia and Trends in Plant Science. Currently he serves on the Boards of Frontiers in Marine Biology and the Royal Society Interface.

He holds the Australian marathon record for 50 and over of 2 h 32m 36s in Sydney.

Molecular and cellular work

Photophysiology
In 1965, Larkum developed an interest in studying algae and seagrasses. He went on to write several papers in this area, including a paper about the ecophysiology of algae and their pigmentation. He also conducted research on the photoinhibition and UV inhibition of algae. In the early 1990s, he studied the role of UV-B radiation in inhibiting growth in algae by inhibiting photosynthesis. This inhibition was shown to affect mainly the photosystem 2 apparatus of photosynthesis.

In the mid 1990s, Larkum turned his focus towards photoinhibition and UV inhibition of algae on coral reefs. In collaboration with colleagues from the Research School of Biological Sciences at the Australian National University, he initiated a study, which for the first time detailed the problem and outlined the various types of photoinhibition and protective measures available to the more common algae of coral reefs. Since 1997, Larkum's photophyioslogical work has been applied to understanding the phenomenon of mass coral bleaching.

Light-harvesting 
In 1967, Larkum developed the first modern interpretation of the distribution of algae in relation to their pigmentation. His early work was concerned with the giant-celled red alga, Griffithsia, resulting in several significant papers. Later work has broadened to include a range of phytoplankton algae, of various groups, and to Prochloron. In addition to the major discoveries involving Prochloron, Larkum discovered four other cyanobacterial symbionts in certain deep-water sponges. In this area, Larkum wrote the 1983 book, Light Harvesting Systems in Algae, published as a second edition update in 1996.

Marine physiology and ecophysiology 
Larkum's early work in this area was concerned with pioneering the use of SCUBA techniques to the field of algal ecology and physiology, in particularly to the theory of chromatic adaptation in algae. Later work considered the growth and productivity of kelps, sublittoral algal and seagrass communities on New South Wales coast, photosynthesis, productivity and nutrient relations of coral reef algae, and calcification in Halimeda, including the formulation of a new mechanism for calcification.

Ecological and environmental work

Seagrasses 
Larkum started work on seagrasses in 1972, when the research in this area was still in its infancy. He pioneered many new approaches including measurement of photosynthesis in a plant with a lacunal gas system, photorespiration, quantifying primary productivity from leaf growth, use of aerial photography in estimating seagrass cover, and the effects of pollutants on seagrass growth. He also did considerable work in studying the historical changes in Botany Bay. Larkum contributed four chapters to the 1989 book The Biology of Seagrasses and became the first editor of Seagrasses, Biology, Ecology and Conservation published in 2003.

Coral reef studies 
Larkum's early work on the productivity and nutrient relations of reef pioneered studies on turf algae and showed that turf algae are the primary source of food for herbivorous fish of coral reefs. This work has had a profound effect on how scientists, and especially trophodynamicists, view the ecology of coral reefs. Later this work was extended to consider the sources of nitrogen for coral reefs, including nitrogen fixation.

This work in the 80s was the spring-board for a significant project: ENCORE (Elevated Nutrients on a Coral Reef) which was instigated by Larkum and officers of the Great Barrier Reef Marine Park Authority (GBRMPA) in 1991. ENCORE arose out of a grant proposal by him to ARC in 1991, and subsequent discussions with GBRMPA. It has fertilising small patches of the reef at One Tree Reef with low levels of nitrogen (as ammonium) and phosphorus (as phosphate) using robots controlled by telemetry. Fertilisation started in Sept 1993 and continued until the end of 1995.

Together with colleagues he published his most quoted paper, on the trigger for coral bleaching in 1998.

Taxonomic studies
Larkum has also carried out taxonomic work which resulted in 'A check list for the algae of Lizard Island', the discovery of several new deepwater species of algae on the Great Barrier Reef and 'A Key to the Green and Brown Algae of New South Wales' by Borowitzka, King and Larkum which was published by the Coastal Council of NSW in 1983. He discovered a new species and named it  Halophila capricorni; type specimens came from One Tree Island on the Great Barrier Reef, but it is also found in New Guinea and New Caledonia waters.

Evolutionary and bioinformatics studies 
Larkum and his colleagues have intensively investigated Prochloron, in areas of gene sequencing and molecular phylogeny. In the 1990s, he and team of scientists cloned the genes of Prochloron to understand the affinities of this alga to chloroplasts of green algae and higher plants. He conducted considerable research in the evolution of Prochloron and cyanobacteria and was also involved in phylogenetic studies of cab genes in a variety of eukaryotic algae, Pavlova lutheri, diatoms and Amphidinium.

Research on Charles Darwin 
Along with his interest in Plant Sciences, Larkum was a keen student of Charles Darwin and his writings on natural selection. In 1986, while he was an associate professor at University of Sydney, he took a six month service leave to go to Cambridge and carry out research on the correspondence between Darwin and his cousin William Darwin Fox. During this research, he followed up leads to the whereabouts of the descendants of Fox and discovered his diaries and letters. For the next 25 year, he continued doing research in this area and published his work in the 2009 book, A Natural Calling: The Life Letters and Diaries of Charles Darwin and William Darwin Fox. He is now engaged on a second book on the interaction of Charles Lyell with Charles Darwin.

Bibliography

Selected papers 
Calcification in the green alga Halimeda: III. The sources of inorganic carbon for photosynthesis and calcification and a model of the mechanism of calcification. Journal of Experimental Botany (1976)
An experimental analysis of factors controlling the standing crop of the epilithic algal community on a coral reef. Journal of Experimental Marine Biology and Ecology (1983)
Light-harvesting processes in algae. Advances in botanical research (1983)
Biology of seagrasses: a treatise on the biology of seagrasses with special reference to the Australian region. Journal of Applied Phycology (1989)
Substitutional bias confounds inference of cyanelle origins from sequence data. Journal of Molecular Evolution (1992)
The effect of UV-B radiation on photosynthesis and respiration of phytoplankton, benthic macroalgae and seagrasses. Photosynthesis Research (1993)
Evolution of chlorophyll and bacteriochlorophyll: the problem of invariant sites in sequence analysis. Proceedings of the National Academy of Sciences (1996)
Independent evolution of the prochlorophyte and green plant chlorophyll a/b light-harvesting proteins. Proceedings of the National Academy of Sciences (1996)
Assessment of photosynthetic performance of Prochloron in Lissoclinum patella in hospite by chlorophyll fluorescence measurements. Plant and Cell Physiology  (1997)
Temperature‐induced bleaching of corals begins with impairment of the CO2 fixation mechanism in zooxanthellae. Plant, Cell & Environment (1998)
Fluorescent pigments in corals are photoprotective. Nature (2000)
ENCORE: the effect of nutrient enrichment on coral reefs. Synthesis of results and conclusions. Marine Pollution Bulletin (2001)
The biasing effect of compositional heterogeneity on phylogenetic estimates may be underestimated. Systematic Biology (2004)
Ecology: a niche for cyanobacteria containing chlorophyll d. Nature (2005)
Selection, breeding and engineering of microalgae for bioenergy and biofuel production. Trends in biotechnology (2012)

Books 
Biological Science, The Web of Life (2nd Edition) (1974)
Biological Science, The Web of Life (3rd Edition) (1981)
Field Guide to the Marine Plants of New South Wales (1983)
Biology of Seagrasses (1990)
Marine Cyanobacteria (1999)
Photosynthesis in Algae (2003)
Seagrasses: Biology, Ecology and Conservation (2006)
A Natural Calling: The Life, Letters and Diaries of Charles Darwin and William Darwin Fox (2009)
Seagrasses of Australia (Springer, 2018)

References 

Living people
20th-century Australian botanists
1940 births